Persian grammar (Dastur-e Zabân-e Fârsi lit. Grammar of the Persian language) is the grammar of the Persian language, whose dialectal variants are spoken in Iran[Hindi] [Afghanistan], Caucasus, Uzbekistan (in Samarqand, Bukhara and the Surxondaryo Region) and Tajikistan. It is similar to that of many other Indo-European languages. The language became a more analytic language around the time of Middle Persian, with fewer cases and discarding grammatical gender. The innovations remain in Modern Persian, which is one of the few Indo-European languages to lack grammatical gender, even in pronouns.

Word order
While Persian has a standard subject-object-verb (SOV) word order, it is not strongly left-branching. However, because Persian is a pro-drop language, the subject of a sentence is often not apparent until the end of the verb, at the end of a sentence.  
 ketâb-e âbi râ didam   "I saw the blue book"
 ketâb-e âbi râ didid  "you(plural) saw the blue book"

The main clause precedes a subordinate clause, often using the familiar Indo-European subordinator ke ("which").

  be man goft ke emruz nemi âmad  "he told me that he wasn't coming today"

The interrogative particle âyâ, that asks a yes-no question, in written Persian, appears at the beginning of a sentence. Grammatical modifiers, such as adjectives, normally follow the nouns they modify by using the ezâfe,  but they occasionally precede nouns. Persian is one of the few SOV languages to use prepositions. The only case marker in the written language, râ (in the spoken language,  ro or  o), follows a definite direct object noun phrase.

 ketâb-e âbi râ az ketâbxâne gereft "she got the blue book from the library"

Normal sentences are subject-prepositional phrase-object-verb. If the object is specific, the order is (S) (O + râ) (PP) V. However, Persian can have a relatively free word order, often called scrambling,  because the parts of speech are generally unambiguous, and prepositions and the accusative marker help to disambiguate the case of a given noun phrase. The scrambling characteristic has allowed Persian a high degree of flexibility for versification and rhyming.

Articles
In the literary language, no definite article ("the") is used; rather, it is implied by the absence of the indefinite article ("a, an"). However, in the spoken language, the stressed suffix  -e or -a is often used as a definite article. -e is mostly used in urban areas and -a is mostly used in rural areas. The first one is in newer dialects and the second one is in older dialects. The consonants and vowels changed throughout history.

Literary:   ketâb ru-ye miz ast  "the book is on the table".
Spoken:  ketâbe ru-ye mizé  "the book is on the table"

For plural nouns, the definite plural marker  -hâ functions as both the plural marker and the definite article.

The indefinite article in both spoken and literary Persian is the number one,  yek, often shortened to  ye.

 ru-ye miz yek ketâb ast  'on the table there is a book'

Nouns

Gender
Persian nouns and pronouns have no grammatical gender. Arabic loanwords with the feminine ending  reduce to a genderless Persian  which is pronounced -e in Persian and -a in Arabic. Many borrowed Arabic feminine words retain their Arabic feminine plural form  (-ât), but Persian descriptive adjectives modifying them have no gender. Arabic adjectives also lose their gender in Persian.

Plural
All nouns can be made plural by the suffix  -hâ, which follows a noun and does not change its form. Plural forms are used less often than in English and are not used after numbers or  ziyâd "many" or  besyâr(i).  -hâ is used only when the noun has no numbers before it and is definite.

 se tâ ketâb "three books"
 besyâr-i- ketâb "X'many books"
 ketâbhâ-ye besyâr "many books"
 ketâbhâ "the books"
 man ketâb râ dust dâram "I like the book"
 ânhâ dânešju hastand "They are students"
 ânhâ dânešjuhâ hastand "They are the students"

In the spoken language, when nouns or pronouns end with a consonant, -hâ is reduced to -â .

Literary:  ânhâ 'they'
Informal spoken: unâ 'they'

In the literary language, animate nouns generally use the suffix  -ân (or variants  -gân and  -yân) for plurals, but  -hâ is more common in the spoken language.

Literary:  parandegân 'birds'
Spoken:  parandehâ  'birds'

Nouns adopted from Arabic usually have special plurals, formed with the ending  -ât or by changing the vowels.  (E.g.  ketâb /  kotob for "book/books".)  Arabic nouns can generally take Persian plural endings, but the original form is sometimes more common. The most common plural form depends on the individual word. (Cf. "indexes" vs. "indices" in English for the plural of a word adopted from Latin.)

Cases
There are two cases in Persian: nominative (or subject) case and accusative (or object) case. The nominative is the unmarked form of a noun, but when the noun is followed by a  râ or suffix  ro or  o, it is in the accusative. The other oblique cases are marked by prepositions.

Nominative:  ketâb ânjâst /  ketâbhâ ânjâyand ('the book is there / the books are there')

Inanimate subjects do not require plural verb forms, especially in the spoken language: ketâbhâ unjâst ('the books "is" there').
Accusative:  ketâbo(/ketâb râ) bede(h) be man 'give me the book'
Possession using ezâfe:  ketâb-e Âraš 'Âraš's book'

Pronouns

Subject pronouns
Persian is a null-subject or pro-drop language, so personal pronouns (e.g. 'I', 'he', 'she') are optional. Pronouns add râ when they are used as the object but otherwise stay the same. The first-person singular accusative form من را man râ 'me' can be shortened to marâ or, in the spoken language, mano. Pronominal genitive enclitics (see above) are different from normal pronouns, however.

&ast; rarely used

&ast; uses 3rd person plural verb form

Persian resembles Romance languages like French in that the second person plural pronoun šomâ is used as a polite form of address. Persian to is used among intimate friends (the so-called T–V distinction). However, Persian also resembles Indo-Aryan languages like Hindustani in that the third person plural form, with the pronoun išun, is used for politeness to refer to one person, especially in the presence of that person:
 Bebaxšid, šomâ Âmrikāyi hastid? 'excuse me, are you an American?'
 Išun be man goftan, berim tu 'he said to me, "Let's go in." '

Possessive determiners
Possession is often expressed by adding suffixes to nouns; the same suffixes can also be used as object pronouns. For the third person these are gender-neutral (unlike in English); for example,  ketâbaš could mean 'his book' or 'her book'.

Examples:
 ketâbetun ru-ye miz e 'your book is on the table'
 ketâbam ru-ye miz ast  'my book is on the table'

When the stem to which they are added ends in a vowel, a y is inserted for ease of pronunciation. However, with the plural marker ـ‌ها -hâ, it is also common in Iranian dialects to drop the -a-/-e- stem from the possessive marker. For example, 'my cars' could be translated as either  mâšinhâyam with the -y- or  mâšinhâm. It can be simplified even more to the colloquial spoken form by dropping h, for ease of pronunciation, to  mâšinâm. Sometimes,  -hâ is written attached to the word:  mâšinhâ.

Ezâfe
Another way of expressing possession is by using subject pronouns or a noun phrase with ezâfe. Although in the third person this implies a change of person. These can also never be used as a possessive or direct object within a clause in which the same is the subject of the verb. 
 ketâb-e šomâ ru-ye miz e  'your book is on the table'
 ketâb-e man ru-ye miz e  'my book is on the table'
 ketâb-e ostâd ru-ye miz ast  'the professor's book is on the table'
 akbar barâdar-e u râ did 'Akbar saw his(ie: someone else's) brother'
 akbar barâdaresh râ did 'Akbar saw his(ie: his own or someone else's) brother'
Correct:  barâdaram râ didam 'I saw my brother'
Incorrect:  barâdar-e man râ didam Since the subject pronoun is used as a possessive pronoun as well with ezafe construction.

Object pronouns
Object pronouns are the same as subject pronouns (followed by the postposition را râ), but objects can also be marked with the possessive determiners described above, which get attached to the verbs instead of nouns and don't need the postposition; consider the example "Yesterday I saw him" shown below.

Demonstrative pronouns 

Adjectives

Adjectives typically follow the nouns they modify, using the ezâfe construct. However, adjectives can precede nouns in compounded derivational forms such as xoš-baxt (literally 'good-luck') 'lucky', and bad-kâr (literally 'bad-deed') 'wicked'. Adjectives can come in any different orders after a noun and in this case adjectives that come at the end have more emphasis.
Comparative forms ('more ...') make use of the suffix -tar, and the superlative form ('the most ...') uses the suffix -tarin.

Comparatives used attributively follow the nouns they modify, but superlatives precede their nouns.

The word 'than' is expressed by the preposition  (az):

Verbs

Normal verbs can be formed using the following pattern:

NEG – DUR or SUBJ/IMPER – root – PAST – PERSON – OBJ
 Negative prefix: na, which changes to ne before the Imperfective prefix (ne-mî-)
 Imperfective or durative prefix:  mî-
 Subjunctive/Imperative prefix:  be-
 Past suffix:  -d, which changes to -t after unvoiced consonants
 Personal suffix: e.g. -am 'I', -i 'you (sg.)' etc.
 Object suffix: the most commonly used is -aš or -eš 'him/her/it'

* In the past tense, the past stem alone is used without any ending (e.g. رفت raft, not رفتد *raftad)

* In the past tense, the past stem alone is used without any ending (رفت raft, not رفته *rafte)

Tenses

Here are the most common tenses:

Infinitive
The infinitive ending is formed with ـَن (-an): خوردن xordan 'to eat'. The basic stem of the verb is formed by deleting this ending: خورد xord.

Past
The past tense is formed by deleting the infinitive ending and adding the personal endings to the stem. In the third person singular, however, there is no personal ending so خوردن xordan would become خورد xord, 'he/she/it ate'.

Imperfect
The imperfect tense is made by taking the past tense as described above and prefixing it with می mî-, thus می‌خوردم mîxordam 'I was eating', 'I used to eat'. This tense can also have a conditional meaning: 'I would eat', 'I would have eaten'.

Perfect
The perfect tense is formed by taking the stem of the verb, adding ـه e to the end and then adding the different persons of the present tense of 'to be'. So خوردن xordan in the perfect first person singular would be خورده‌ام xordeam 'I have eaten' and the 3rd person singular would become خورده است xorde ast.  However, in the spoken form, ast is omitted, making خورده xorde 's/he has eaten".

Pluperfect
The pluperfect tense is formed by taking the stem of the perfect, e.g. خورده xorde, adding بود bud, and finally adding the personal endings: خورده بودم xorde budam 'I had eaten'. In the third person singular, بود bud is added (with no ending).

Future
The future tense is formed by taking the present tense form of خواستن xâstan 'to want', and conjugating it to the correct person; this verb in third person singular is خواهد xâhad. Next, it is put in front of the shortened infinitive of the verb, e.g. خورد xord, thus  خواهد خورد xâhad xord 'he/she/it will eat'. For compound verbs, such as تمیز کردن tamiz kardan 'to clean', خواهد xâhad goes in between both words, and کردن kardan is reduced to its stem, thus تمیز خواهد کرد tamiz xâhad kard 'he/she/it will clean'. In the negative, خواهد xâhad receives نـ na- to make نخواهد خورد naxâhad xord 'he will not eat'. The future tense is generally avoided in colloquial Persian.

Present
The present tense is formed by taking the present stem of the verb, adding the prefix می mî-, and conjugating it. The present stem is often not predictable from the infinitive and so is to be learnt separately. The present stem of the verb خوردن xordan 'to eat' for example, is خور xor, so the present first person singular would be می‌خورم mîxoram 'I eat, am eating, do eat'. The third person singular ending is ـد -ad. The negative نـ is pronounced ne- before mî-, but in all other tenses, it is pronounced na-. Frequently the present tense is used together with an adverb (for example: فردا fardâ 'tomorrow') instead of the future tense described above.

فردا به سينما می‌رود fardâ be sinemâ mîravad 'tomorrow he will go to cinema'

Present subjunctive
The present subjunctive is made by changing the prefix mî- of the present tense to بـ be- or bo- (before a verb with the vowel o): بخورم boxoram 'I may eat, let me eat', بنويسم benevisam 'I may write', 'let me write'.

Compound verbs
Light verbs such as کردن kardan 'to do, to make' are often used with nouns to form what is called a compound verb, light verb construction, or complex predicate. For example, the word گفتگو goftegu means 'conversation', while گفتگو کردن goftegu kardan means 'to speak'. One may add a light verb after a noun, adjective, preposition, or prepositional phrase to form a compound verb. Only the light verb (e.g. kardan) is conjugated; the word preceding it is not affected:

 دارم گفتگو می‌کنم dâram goftegu mîkonam 'I am speaking'
 گفتگو کرده‌ام goftegu kardeam 'I have spoken'
 گفتگو خواهم کرد goftegu xâham kard 'I will speak'

Other examples of compound verbs with kardan:
 فراموش کردن farâmuš kardan 'to forget'
 گریه کردن gerye kardan 'to cry'
 تلفن کردن telefon kardan 'to call, to telephone'
 بازسازی کردن bâzsâzi kardan 'to fix'

Auxiliary verbs
 باید bâyad 'must': Not conjugated.  Dependent clause is subjunctive
 شاید šâyad 'might': Not conjugated.  Dependent clause is subjunctive
 توانستن tavânestan 'can' (literally 'to be able to'): Conjugated.  The dependent clause is subjunctive
 خواستن xâstan 'want': Conjugated.  Dependent clause is subjunctive
 خواستن xâstan 'will': Conjugated.  Main verb is tenseless

Simplified spoken verbs
In the spoken language, certain commonly used verbs are pronounced in a shortened form:
رفتن raftan 'to go' (Literary present form rav-) Spoken present form r-. E.g. mîram 'I go', mîri 'you go', berim 'let's go'
دادن dâdan 'to give' (Literary present form deh-) Spoken present form d-. E.g. mîdam 'I give', mîdim 'we give'
گفتن goftan 'to say' (Literary present form gu-) Spoken present form g-. E.g. mîgam 'I say', mîgin 'you say'
آمدن âmadan 'to come' (Literary present form ây-) Spoken present form â-. E.g. mîyâm 'I am coming'
خواستن xâstan 'to want' (Literary present form xâh-) Spoken present form xâ-. E.g. mîxâm 'I want'

Prepositions
Prepositions in Persian generally behave like in English and precede their object. They come in two kinds: the basic prepositions such as dar 'in', which are placed directly before the noun or pronoun without an ezâfe, and a more numerous class, made from nouns or adverbs joined to the following noun by an ezâfe (-e or -ye). They include the following:

 az (از) 'from'
 bâ (با) 'with'
 bar (بر) 'on'
 barâ-ye (برای) 'for'
 be (به) 'to'
 bi (بی) 'without'
 dar (در) 'in'
 mânand-e (مانند) 'like'
 mesl-e (مثل) 'like'
 ru-ye (روی) 'on'
 tâ (تا) 'till, until'
 tu-ye (توی) 'in'
 zir-e (زير) 'under'

See also
 Persian language
 Tajik grammar
 Kurdish grammar

References

Bibliography
 Abrahams, Simin (2005). Modern Persian: A Course-Book. Routledge.
 Bleeck, Arthur Henry (1857). A Concise Grammar of the Persian Language.
 Brookshaw, Dominic Parviz (2010). The Routledge Introductory Persian Course: Farsi Shirin Ast. Routledge.
 Boyle, John Andrew (1966). Grammar of Modern Persian. Harrassowitz, Wiesbaden.
 Dahlen, Ashk (2010). Modern persisk grammatik (2nd edition 2014) (Swedish)
 Doctor, Sorabshaw Byramji (1875). A New Grammar Of The Persian Tongue, Part 1, Accidence: For The Use Of The Higher Classes In Schools And Colleges (reprinted 2010).
 Elwell-Sutton, L.P. (1963). Elementary Persian Grammar.
 Forbes, B. (1985). A Grammar of the Persian Language (reprinted 2003).
 Forbes, Duncan (1869). A Grammar of the Persian Language (4th edition).
 Ibrahim, Meerza Mohammad (1841). A Grammar Of The Persian Language: To Which Are Subjoined Several Dialogues; With An Alphabetical List Of The English And Persian Terms Of Grammar.
 Johnson, Edwin Lee (1917). Historical Grammar of the Ancient Persian Language.
 Jones, Sir William (1771). A Grammar of the Persian Language.
 Kent, Roland G. (1950). Old Persian: Grammar, Texts, Lexicon.
 Lambton, Ann K.S. (1953) Persian Grammar. Cambridge University Press.
 Lazard, Gilbert; Lyon, Shirley A. (1993). A Grammar of Contemporary Persian (Persian Studies, No 14) (paperback).
 Mace, John (2003). Persian Grammar: For Reference and Revision. Routledge Curzon.
 Mahootian, Shahrzad (1997). Persian (Descriptive Grammars).
 Obolensky, Serge; Yazdan Panah, Kambiz; Khaje Nouri, Fereidoun (1963). Persian Basic Course units 1–12. Foreign Service Institute, Washington. (Republished as Spoken Persian in 1973.)
 Phillott, D. C. (1919) Higher Persian Grammar: For The Use Of The Calcutta University, vols, 1 and 2. (reprinted 2008)
 Platts, John T. (1894). A Grammar of the Persian language, Part I, Accidence.
 Rafiee, Abdi (1975). Colloquial Persian. Routledge.
 Rosen, Friedrich (reprinted 2010). Modern Persian Colloquial Grammar: Containing a Short Grammar, Dialogues and Extracts from Nasir-Eddin Shah's Diaries, Tales, Etc., and a Vocabulary (originally written in German in 1890).
 St. Clair-Tisdall, William (1902). Modern Persian Conversation-Grammar; With Reading Lessons, English-Persian Vocabulary and Persian Letters.
 Stilo, Donald L.; Clinton Jerome (1994). Modern Persian: Spoken and Written.
 Thackston, Wheeler M. (1993) An Introduction to Persian (3rd edition). IBEX.
 Windfuhr, Gernot L. (1979). Persian Grammar: History and State of Its Study (Trends in Linguistics State of the Art Reports, No 12).
 Windfuhr, Gernot L. (1980). Modern Persian: Intermediate level 1. University of Michigan Press.
 Yousef, Saeed & Torabi, Hayedeh (2012): Basic Persian: A Grammar and Workbook. Routledge.
 Yousef, Saeed & Torabi, Hayedeh (2013): Intermediate Persian: A Grammar and Workbook. Routledge.

Further reading
 Perry, John R. "Persian morphology." Morphologies of Asia and Africa 2 (2007): 975–1019.
 
Windfuhr, Gernot L. Persian grammar: History and state of its study. Vol. 12. Walter de Gruyter, 2011.

External links
 Persian Grammar by Navid Fazel (English; German)
 Persian Grammar and Resources
 Introduction to Persian grammar (in Persian)
 Learning Persian grammar: an introduction (in Persian)
 A brief Persian grammar course written by Ahmad Shamlou (in Persian)
 BBC's complete guide to Persian grammar (in Persian)
 Grammar and Its Standards is a manuscript, in Arabic, about Persian grammar. It dates from 1553.

Online Persian verb conjugators
 Persian verb conjugator – Online conjugation of Persian verbs